Latisha "Tish" Hyman, commonly known as Tish, is an African-American singer-songwriter and rapper.

Early life
Hyman was born and raised in the Bronx, where she began battle rapping at an early age.

Career

Beginnings
In 2010 Hyman moved to Los Angeles, California and began writing songs for other artists. In 2011 she wrote a song for Ahsan Watts which helped him get signed to Interscope, and gave Hyman recognition as a songwriter. She subsequently landed a publishing deal at Universal Music Publishing Group and went on to write songs with Alicia Keys, Diddy, Kanye West and Kelly Rowland.

Single release and EP
Hyman's first single, Subway Art, was released on March 3, 2015, and the video premiered on The Fader on April 27, 2015. The song, which describes the struggles of those who use the New York City subway trains on a daily basis, brought stylistic and vocal comparisons to Lauryn Hill. Her second single, "Home For Christmas", premiered on Vibe and on Ebro Darden's radio show on December 15, 2015.

She was featured on Fabolous' 2015 single You Made Me and on Dom Kennedy's 2015 single "2 Bad". She was the first female rapper in 2015 to successfully complete the "5 Fingers of Death" freestyle challenge on Sway in the Morning on Sirius XM. She wrote Ty Dolla Sign's "Horses in the Stable" off his 2015 album Free TC.

Hyman's debut EP, Dedicated To, was released on July 12, 2016, with production by Bink, William Larsen, Timothy Bloom, Dave Kuncio, Nate Walka and others.

Touring
She opened for Jill Scott on the US leg of her 2015 tour.

Discography

Extended plays

Singles
 "Subway Art" (March 15, 2015)
 "Home For Christmas" (December 12, 2015)
 "What It Feels Like" - Feat.Ty Dolla $ign & Dej Loaf (April 7, 2017)
"No Strings" - Feat. 24hrs (July 2, 2018)
"Summer Time" - Feat. Kill Nigel (August 13, 2018)

Appears on
 "6AM" – Gorgon City feat. Tish Hyman, from Sirens (Priority Records, October 7, 2014)
 "You Made Me" – Fabolous feat. Tish Hyman, from The Young OG Project (Def Jam Recordings, December 25, 2014)
 "2 Bad" – Dom Kennedy feat. Tish Hyman, from By Dom Kennedy (The Other People's Money Company, June 9, 2015)
 "Fly By Night" – Broiler feat. Tish Hyman (Casablanca, August 14, 2015)
 "Everyday (Amor)" – Puff Daddy feat. Jadakiss, Styles P, Pusha T & Tish Hyman, from MMM (Bady Boy/Epic, December 18, 2015)
 "Gotta Find Love" – Marley Waters feat. Tish Hyman, from Transitions (Marley Waters Productions, June 10, 2016)
 “Streets” - Black Thought and Salaam Remix feat. Tish Hyman, from Streams of Thought, Vol. 2
 "Taboo" - Denzel Curry, from TA13OO
 "Dream Went Bad" - Childish Major feat. Tish Hyman, from Dirt Road Diamond
 "The Light" - The Game, from Born 2 Rap
 "Feel It (You Got It)" - The Roots feat. Tish Hyman
 "Your Turn" - Ty Dolla Sign feat. Musiq Soulchild, Tish Hyman and 6lack, from Featuring Ty Dolla Sign (2020)

Filmography

References

External links
 Official website

Living people
1983 births
African-American women singer-songwriters
African-American women rappers
American hip hop singers
American rhythm and blues singer-songwriters
Singers from New York City
Singers from Los Angeles
Entertainers from the Bronx
21st-century American rappers
American lesbian musicians
20th-century American LGBT people
21st-century LGBT people
21st-century African-American women singers
Singer-songwriters from California
Singer-songwriters from New York (state)
21st-century women rappers